Jake Reinhart is an American photographer from Pittsburgh, Pennsylvania.

Life and work 
Reinhart has worked extensively in his native Pittsburgh. The resulting images have been featured online in Slate and exhibited at the Colorado Photographic Arts Center, and Silver Eye Center for Photography.

Reinhart joined the board of Silver Eye Center for Photography in 2015.

Awards 
 Flight School Fellowship - September, 2017
 Pittsburgh Filmmakers Emerging Photographers Grant
 Greater Pittsburgh Arts Counsel Artist Opportunity Grant

Publications 
 Where the Land Gives Way. Los Angeles: Deadbeat Club, 2017.
 Unquiet Grave. Self Published, 2016
 Wasteland. Self Published, 2015

Collections 
 London College of Communication Special Collection
 PNC Bank, NA. Corporate Art Collection
 RISD Fleet Library Special Collection
 International Center for Photography
 Philadelphia Photo Arts Center
 Center for Documentary Studies at Duke University

References 

American photographers
Living people
Year of birth missing (living people)